Jane Brereton (1685–1740) was a Welsh poet who wrote in English. She was notable as a correspondent for The Gentleman's Magazine.

Biography
Jane was born in 1685, the daughter of Thomas Hughes of Bryn Gruffydd, near Mold, Flintshire, and his wife Anne Jones. Unusually for a girl at the time, Jane was educated at least up to the age of 16, when her father died. She showed an early interest in poetry.

In January 1711, she married Thomas Brereton, at the time a commoner of Brasenose College, Oxford. Her husband soon spent his fortune and went over to Paris. Some time after that, a separation took place and she retired in 1721 to Flintshire, where she led a solitary life, seeing little company other than some intimate friends. About that time Thomas Brereton obtained from Charles Spencer, 3rd Earl of Sunderland a post belonging to the customs at Parkgate, Cheshire, but in February 1722 he was drowned in the River Dee at Saltney, when the tide was coming in. His widow then retired to Wrexham for the benefit of her children's education, where she died 7 August 1740, aged 55, leaving two daughters, Lucy and Charlotte.

Verses
Brereton possessed talents for versification, if not for poetry, which she displayed for some years as a correspondent to The Gentleman's Magazine, under the pseudonym Melissa. There she had a competitor who signed himself FIDO and is supposed to have been Thomas Beach. After her death a volume of her Poems on Several Occasions; with letters to her friends; and an account of her life, was published in London in 1744. A number of her poems were reprinted in subsequent collections.

Katherine Turner, writing in the Oxford Dictionary of National Biography notes that "Brereton's body of poetry displays a flair for tactful occasional writing, and represents a transitional moment in women's writing in the 18th century, a moment at which being a published writer while retaining respectability was becoming a real possibility."

Selected works
The Fifth Ode of the Fourth Book of Horace Imitated: And Apply'd to the King. London: William Hinchcliffe, 1716 (Foxon B408)
An Expostulary Epistle to Sir Richard Steele upon the Death of Mr. Addison. London: William Hinchliffe, 1720 (Foxon B408)
Merlin: A Poem. London: Edward Cave, 1735 (Foxon B409)
Poems on Several Occasions. London: Edward Cave, 1744

References

Bibliography
Backscheider, Paula R. "Friendship Poems". In Eighteenth-Century Women Poets and Their Poetry: Inventing Agency, Inventing Genre. Baltimore: Johns Hopkins UP, 2005. pp. 175–232
Barker, Anthony D. "Poetry from the Provinces: Amateur Poets in the Gentleman's Magazine in the 1730s and 1740s" In: Tradition in Transition: Women Writers, Marginal Texts, and the Eighteenth-Century Canon, eds. Alvaro Ribiero and James Basker. Oxford: Clarendon Press, 1996
Foxon, David F. English Verse 1701–1750: A Catalogue of Separately Printed Poems with Notes on Contemporary Collected Editions. 2 vols. Cambridge: Cambridge UP, 1975
Kizer, Kathleen S. "The Gentleman's Magazine and the Marketing of Women Poets, 1731–1754." PhD Diss. Georgetown University, 1988
Lonsdale, Roger. Eighteenth Century Women Poets: An Oxford Anthology, Oxford: Oxford UP, 1989
Overon, Bill. The Eighteenth-Century British Verse Epistle, Hampshire: Palgrave MacMillan, 2007
Prescott, Sarah. "The Cambrian Muse: Welsh Identity and Hanoverian Loyalty in the Poems of Jane Brereton (1685-1740)" 38.4 (Summer 2005) Eighteenth Century Studies. pp. 587–603

External links

1685 births
1740 deaths
18th-century Welsh women writers
18th-century Welsh poets
Anglo-Welsh women poets
People from Mold, Flintshire